Deon Jackson may refer to:

Deon Jackson (singer) (1946–2014), American soul singer and songwriter
Deon Jackson (American football) (born 1999), American football running back

See also
 Don Jackson (disambiguation)